Alicia en el país de las maravillas (English:Alice in Wonderland) is an Argentinian live action 1976 Spanish language adaptation of Alice in Wonderland.

Cast
 Mónica Von Reust as  Alice
 Carlos Lorca as White Rabbit
 Marta Serrano as Queen of Hearts
 Ricardo Bouzas as King of Hearts
 Evelyn Rodriguez as Duchess
 Nano Gruberg as Mad Hatter
 Rubén Fraga as Cheshire Cat
 Tina Write as Alice's Sister
 Raúl Indart Rougier as Dodo
 Ernesto Leal as Mouse
 Roberto Granados as Caterpillar
 Paulino Andrada as Gryphon
 Marta Larreina as Mock Turtle
 Eduardo Rosales as Fish Footman
 Sally Cutting as March Hare
 Angela Da Silva as Cook
 Bruno Llácer as Humpty Dumpty

External links

1976 films
Argentine animated films
Films based on Alice in Wonderland
1970s Argentine films